Michigan's 101st House of Representatives district (also referred to as Michigan's 101st House district) is a legislative district within the Michigan House of Representatives located in parts of Lake, Mason, and Oceana counties, as well as all of Newaygo and Wexford counties. The district was created in 1965, when the Michigan House of Representatives district naming scheme changed from a county-based system to a numerical one.

List of representatives

Recent Elections

Historical district boundaries

References 

Michigan House of Representatives districts
Benzie County, Michigan
Leelanau County, Michigan
Manistee County, Michigan
Mason County, Michigan